The Hartland Covered Bridge in Hartland, New Brunswick, is the world's longest covered bridge, at  long.  It crosses the Saint John River from Hartland to Somerville, New Brunswick, Canada. The framework consists of seven small Howe Truss bridges joined together on six piers.

History

Before the bridge, the only way to cross the Saint John River was by ferry. Plans and specifications of the bridge began in 1898 and the bridge was constructed in 1901 by the Hartland Bridge Company. On May 13, 1901, Dr. Estey was the first person to cross the bridge before its scheduled opening, because he had to respond to an emergency call. Workers placed planks on the bridge so he could drive across the bridge. It was finally inaugurated by Justice McKeowan on July 4, 1901 before a crowd of 2,000 people. It was funded by tolls until it was purchased by the provincial government on May 1, 1906. The bridge was not originally built covered.

A fire in 1907 burnt some of the structure and nearly destroyed the toll house. The tolls had been removed earlier that year.

On April 6, 1920, two spans of the bridge collapsed due to river ice. The bridge reopened in 1922 after construction to repair the structure, at which time the bridge was also covered, despite some local opposition. The wooden piers were also converted to concrete.

A pedestrian walkway was added to the bridge in 1945. In 1966, vandals attempted to burn the bridge down. In 1970, heavy trucks were barred from crossing the bridge. The bridge was declared a National Historic Site in 1980, and a Provincial Historic Site in 1999.

In 1982, the bridge was again closed for repairs after a car struck a steel beam, causing part of the bridge to drop. The bridge was reopened to traffic on February 10, 1983.

In 2006, the town of Hartland contributed a small piece of wood from the bridge to the Six String Nation project. Part of this material now serves as one of the reinforcing strips on the interior of Voyageur, the guitar at the heart of the project.

In the winter of 2007, the bridge was closed due to the central beam splitting down the middle. It has since been reopened after repairs were carried out.

On July 4, 2012, in honour of its 111th anniversary, it was celebrated with a Google Doodle on Google's Canadian homepage.

Legends
When the bridge was mostly used by horse and wagon, couples would stop half-way across to share a kiss. The first wedding on the bridge was celebrated in September 1992 between Charmaine Laffoley and Dana Hunt from Toronto. It is thought by some locals to be good luck to hold one's breath the entire way across while driving.

Characteristics

Location 
The bridge is situated in Southeastern Canada, in the western part of New Brunswick, between the municipality of Hartland to the east and the local service district of Somerville, in Carleton County, New Brunswick. Oriented west-southwest to east-northeast, it is used by a small route connecting New Brunswick routes 103 and 105 that crosses the Saint John River just south of the island of Middle Becaguimec.

Since the construction of the Hugh John Flemming Bridge in 1960 used by New Brunswick Route 130 one kilometre to the north, the Hartland bridge is now used exclusively for local and tourist traffic.

Dimensions 

A small gallery, also covered and permitting access to pedestrians, is attached on the South side of the bridge.

See also
 List of bridges in Canada
 List of crossings of the Saint John River
 Structure gauge

References

External links
 

Road bridges in New Brunswick
Bridges completed in 1901
Covered bridges in Canada
Buildings and structures in Carleton County, New Brunswick
Transport in Carleton County, New Brunswick
Bridges over the Saint John River (Bay of Fundy)
National Historic Sites in New Brunswick
Wooden bridges in Canada
Tourist attractions in Carleton County, New Brunswick
Bridges on the National Historic Sites of Canada register
Former toll bridges in Canada
Howe truss bridges in the United States